Luis Gatty Ribeiro Roca (born 1 November 1979) is a Bolivian former professional footballer who played as a defender. He played club football for Bolívar, Real Potosí, The Strongest, Guabirá and Universitario Pando, and was capped 36 times by Bolivia.

Club career
He previously played for Bolívar.

International career
He played 36 games for the Bolivia national team between 2000 and 2009 and represented his country in 27 FIFA World Cup qualification matches.

References

External links

Bolívar topscorers
 

1979 births
Living people
People from Cobija
Association football defenders
Bolivian footballers
Bolivia international footballers
Club Bolívar players
Club Real Potosí players
The Strongest players
Guabirá players
2001 Copa América players